The Habematolel Pomo of Upper Lake is a federally recognized tribe of Pomo Indians in Lake County, California. The tribe's reservation, the Upper Lake Rancheria, is  large and located near the town of Upper Lake in northwestern California.

History
The Habematolel Pomo are indigenous to California's Clear Lake Basin. Artifacts made by early Native Americans in the Clear Lake Basin have been carbon-dated to 8,000 years ago, although tribal occupation probably extends back further in time. By 6,000 years ago the entire lake was used by tribes evenly settled around the lake shore. By 1800, Pomo population in California was an estimated to be 10,000-18,000 people, belonging to 70 different Pomo tribes and speaking seven different Pomo languages. The Habematolel Pomo, were some of the estimated 350 Northern Pomo. The Habematolel Pomo belong to the Northern and Eastern Pomo language groups, both of which are considered today to be extinct.

Known for their extensive trade networks, the Habematolel Pomo traded magnesite and obsidian with the Coast Miwoks for a variety of shells. Pomo are known for their woven baskets and elaborate feather headdresses.

The Bloody Island Massacre or Bonopoti occurred in 1850, on "Old Island", at the north end of Clear Lake. The 1st Dragoons US Cavalry slaughtered almost 200 Pomos, mostly women and children of the Clear Lake Pomo and neighboring tribes.

In 1856, the Lake County Pomo were rounded up by the US military and forced to relocate onto the Nome Cult Indian Farm in Round Valley in northern Mendocino County. This later became the Round Valley Indian Reservation.

Faced with the onslaught on non-Indian settlers in their homelands, four Pomo groups, the Danoxa, Kaiyo-Matuku, Xowalek, and Yobotui, pooled their resources and purchased  of land in 1878 at Xabematolel. This community was called Habematolel in Upper Lake. In 1907, the US federal government created the Upper Lake Rancheria for the tribe on adjacent land. The reservation grew to be .

As part of its Termination and Relocation Policy in the interest of assimilating Natives into mainstream society, the US government passed the California Rancheria Act of 1953. This law enabled the US to terminate relationships with the Habematolel Pomo and break up the lands of the Upper Lake Rancheria into individual allotments.

The tribe responded with a lawsuit, Upper Lake Pomo Association v. James Watt, in 1975 saying that termination was an illegal policy. In 1980 the Bureau of Indian Affairs oversaw an election of a tribal council, who began drafting a new tribal constitution and bylaws. In 1983 the tribe won its federal court case and tribal recognition was restored in 1998, when a new council was elected. The current constitution was ratified in 2004.

Today
The tribe is federally recognized and has 191 enrolled members. The Habematolel Pomo operate their own housing, environmental, and educational programs, including computer classes and GED preparation. The tribe has been able to purchase land on its traditional territory, near the historical tribe village of Maiyi.

The Habematolel Pomo are governed by an elected, seven-member tribal council. As of early 2009, they are:
Sherry Treppa Bridges, Chairperson
Angelina Arroyo, Vice-Chairperson
Iris Picton, Secretary
Kimberly Cobarrubia, Treasurer
Ida Morrison, Member-at-Large
Aaron Holstine, Member-At-Large
Aimee Jackson, Member-at-Large.

In 2014, the Habematolel Pomo were featured in an article published in Al Jazeera English language edition, as an example of a federally recognized sovereign tribe involved in the short-term loans industry.  In 2017, the Tribe was sued by the Federal Consumer Protection Agency over loan practices.

See also
Pomo people

References

External links
Habematolel Pomo of Upper Lake

Native American tribes in California
Lake County, California
Pomo tribe
Federally recognized tribes in the United States